Stenogonum is a genus of plants in the family Polygonaceae with 2 species endemic to North America.

References 

Polygonaceae genera